Neololeba atra, the black bamboo, is a species of tropical Asian, Australian, and Papuasian bamboos in the grass family Poaceae.

Habit
It forms impenetrable thickets with densely clustered clumps with a large number of closely growing culms. It is native to the Philippines, Sulawesi, Maluku, New Guinea, Bismarck Archipelago, and Queensland. It is an exotic species in Indian subcontinent countries, such as India and Sri Lanka.

Appearance
Culms are dark green when young, and become yellowish-green when mature and brownish-green when dry. Young shoots are also green. Internode length is 60–80 cm and diameter is about 2.5 to 5.0 cm. Culm walls are very thin. Nodes are not prominent. Branching occurs only at the top and no aerial roots can be seen.

Culm sheaths are green in young plants, becoming straw-colored when mature. Culm sheath blades are flame-shaped. The sheath proper is 9–12 cm long and 6–9 cm wide. Auricles are equal, small, and wavy, continuous with the blade, which is situated on top of the sheath. Upper surfaces of the culm sheaths are covered with light brown hairs. Under surfaces are not hairy. Sheaths fall off early.

Uses
In Indonesia, strips of the black bamboo are used to make window blinds and the leaves are used for thatching.

References

The Plant List

Bambusoideae